The P&LE Liberty Boro Bridge is a girder bridge across the Youghiogheny River connecting the Pittsburgh industrial suburbs of Liberty and McKeesport, Pennsylvania. In 1968, the Pittsburgh & Lake Erie Railroad undertook a major construction project in conjunction with the B&O Railroad to clear tracks from downtown McKeesport. These tracks caused traffic congestion and posed a safety hazard. As a result, both this bridge and the nearby P&LE McKeesport Bridge were created to direct rail traffic to the west bank of the river, which featured a less confusing street grid.

While its sister structure is a truss bridge that crosses the river parallel to a highway bridge, the Liberty Boro Bridge appears relatively utilitarian and crosses the river at a nearly diagonal angle. The structure currently serves the Pittsburgh-to-Cumberland, Maryland CSX Keystone Subdivision.

References
PGH Bridges

Bridges in Allegheny County, Pennsylvania
Bridges completed in 1968
Railroad bridges in Pennsylvania
Bridges over the Youghiogheny River
Girder bridges in the United States
1968 establishments in Pennsylvania